Balleny Fracture Zone is a fracture zone in the Southern Ocean that extends south towards the Balleny Islands. The name was approved by the Advisory Committee for Undersea Features in December 1971.

References
 

Geology of the Southern Ocean
Fracture zones